Henrician ("of or relating to Henry") may refer to:

a follower of the heterodox preacher Henry of Lausanne (died 1148)
Henrician Reformation, the first phase of the English Reformation (begun 1532) under Henry VIII
Henrician castles, also called the Device Forts (1539–47), built by Henry VIII
Henrician Articles (1573), electoral capitulation of the Polish king, first signed by Henry of Valois